Embree Glacier is a  long glacier in the north-central part of Sentinel Range, Ellsworth Mountains, draining the eastern slopes of Mount Hale, Mount Davis and Mount Bentley, the northeast slopes of Mount Anderson, and the northwestern slopes of Probuda Ridge, flowing north-northeastwards and north of Mount Schmid turning east to join Rutford Ice Stream east of Mount Tegge.  Named by the US-ACAN for Maj. Henry Embree, USAF, who participated in the establishment of the South Pole Station in 1956. Embree Glacier is in Antarctica.

Location
US mapping in 1961, updated in 1988.

Tributary glaciers
 Kopsis Glacier
 Padala Glacier
 Marsa Glacier
 Patleyna Glacier

See also
 List of glaciers in the Antarctic
 Glaciology

Maps
 Vinson Massif.  Scale 1:250 000 topographic map.  Reston, Virginia: US Geological Survey, 1988.
 Antarctic Digital Database (ADD). Scale 1:250000 topographic map of Antarctica. Scientific Committee on Antarctic Research (SCAR). Since 1993, regularly updated.

External links
 Antarctic research Atlas USGS
 SCAR Composite Antarctic Gazetteer

Glaciers of Ellsworth Land
Ellsworth Mountains